Josephus Lyman Mavretic (born July 29, 1934) is a former Democratic public official and military veteran from North Carolina. Born in Currituck County, he made his career as a Marine, graduating from the Naval War College and becoming a Marine fighter pilot, retiring at the rank of lieutenant colonel. Mavretic had served 300 combat missions in Vietnam and recorded 3000 hours of flight time.

He retired from the Marines and returned to his home state. He came from a Democratic family and community, and he ran successfully for the North Carolina House of Representatives as a Democrat in 1980. He succeeded Jim Ezzell. In spite of his party label, he admired President Ronald Reagan and was willing to buck his party on several issues.

Mavretic became nationally known when he led a bipartisan coalition to remove Liston Ramsey from the position of Speaker of the House. He then served in that position from 1989 to 1990.

He left the legislature in 1995 and retired to private life. He is now a panelist on the television news talk show NC Spin.

References

External links
Our Campaigns – Representative Josephus Mavretic (NC) profile

|-

|-

|-

Living people
United States Marine Corps officers
1934 births
Naval War College alumni
20th-century American politicians
Speakers of the North Carolina House of Representatives
Democratic Party members of the North Carolina House of Representatives
People from Currituck County, North Carolina